Benjamin James Tarbutton (May 14, 1885 – September 19, 1962), was a businessman and politician in Georgia.

Early life
Benjamin James Tarbutton was born on May 14, 1885 in Sandersville, Georgia. He graduated from Emory College in Oxford, Georgia in 1905. He was a member of the Phi Delta Theta fraternity.

Career
After working in his father's mercantile business, he purchased the Sandersville Railroad in 1916, and was the president and director of the Central of Georgia Railroad from 1951 to 1954. He was involved in starting the kaolin mining industry to Sandersville. He was mayor of Sandersville from 1948 to 1952, a member Georgia State Senate from 1947 to 1949 and of the Georgia House of Representatives from 1949 to 1953, and a member of the Georgia delegation to the Democratic National Convention in 1952 and 1956.

Personal life
Tarbutton married Rosa Moore McMaster of Waynesboro, Georgia on November 22, 1928. They had two children, Ben and Hugh.

Death
Tarbutton died on September 19, 1962 in Sandersville. He was buried at the Old City Cemetery in Sandersville.

References

1885 births
1962 deaths
Emory University alumni
Members of the Georgia House of Representatives
Georgia (U.S. state) state senators
People from Sandersville, Georgia
20th-century American politicians